Fall Down Dead is a slasher film released in 2007 starring Dominique Swain and Udo Kier. The storyline involves a metropolitan city in the grip of fear after rolling blackouts bring out a serial killer dubbed "The Picasso Killer". One night, in the middle of a blackout, seven strangers trapped in an office building are targeted by the killer as he seeks out the one that knows his true identity.

Cast

 Dominique Swain - Christie Wallace
 Mehmet Günsür - Detective Stefan Kercheck (as Mehmet Gunsur)
 Udo Kier - Picasso Killer / Aaron Garvey
 David Carradine - Wade Douglas

Reception

Fall Down Dead has a 0% on Rotten Tomatoes based on 7 reviews, with an average rating of 1.96/10.

References

External links
 
 
 

2007 films
2007 horror films
American slasher films
Films scored by Pinar Toprak
2000s English-language films
2000s American films